Rhinehart Township is a township in Polk County, Minnesota, United States. It is part of the Grand Forks-ND-MN Metropolitan Statistical Area. The population was 139 at the 2010 census.

Rhinehart Township was named for Captain A. C. Rhinehart, a county official.

Geography
According to the United States Census Bureau, the township has a total area of 2.8 square miles (7.4 km), all land.

Demographics

As of the census of 2000, there were 91 people, 31 households, and 23 families residing in the township. There were 32 housing units at an average density of 11.2/sq mi (4.3/km). The racial makeup of the township was 98.90% White and 1.10% Asian.

There were 31 households, out of which 38.7% had children under the age of 18 living with them, 74.2% were married couples living together, 3.2% had a female householder with no husband present, and 22.6% were non-families. 22.6% of all households were made up of individuals, and 6.5% had someone living alone who was 65 years of age or older. The average household size was 2.94 and the average family size was 3.46.

In the township the population was spread out, with 33.0% under the age of 18, 5.5% from 18 to 24, 25.3% from 25 to 44, 26.4% from 45 to 64, and 9.9% who were 65 years of age or older. The median age was 36 years. For every 100 females, there were 85.7 males. For every 100 females age 18 and over, there were 96.8 males.

The median income for a household in the township was $63,500, and the median income for a family was $63,333. Males had a median income of $63,125 versus $24,375 for females. The per capita income for the township was $24,876. There were no families and 2.2% of the population living below the poverty line, including no under eighteens and none of those over 64.

References

Townships in Polk County, Minnesota
Townships in Minnesota